The Victoria plum is a type of English plum. It has a yellow flesh with a red or mottled skin. This plum is a cultivar of the egg plum group (Prunus domestica ssp. intermedia).

The fruit is oval or ovate in shape. The ground colour is greenish yellow, mostly covered with purple. The stone is semi-clinging and does not come off completely from the flesh but the skin is easy to pull off. The flesh is quite rough, light yellow and in good development and full maturity is sweet and tasty. Maturation time is mid-to-late September (in some places). It is a good table and household fruit.

The tree is quite hardy and grows strongly but is not very large. The bloom is medium-early and self-fertile. It is rarely attacked by diseases, but the fruit is by mold. Flowers must be thinned heavily for the fruits to reach full development. The trees rarely get old due to their high fruit production.

The name "Victoria" comes from Queen Victoria (1819–1901). The variety was supposedly first discovered in a garden in Alderton, Sussex, but there has never been a place named Alderton in Sussex. A number of hypotheses have been advanced to explain the true origin of the variety. It was introduced commercially in Sweden in 1844 by a nursery owner, Denyer, under the name of Denyer's Victoria. This strain quickly became very popular in Sweden in the late 19th century.

The Victoria plum contains the anthocyanin chrysanthemin.

See also
 List of foods named after people

References

Plum cultigens